Mikhail Nikiforovich Poltoranin (born 22 November 1939) is a Russian journalist and politician who held senior government posts under the first President of Russia, Boris Yeltsin. Most notably, Poltoranin served as the minister of information and later as the deputy prime minister for the sphere of the press and news.

Biography
During the Soviet era he worked with the Communist Party daily Moskovskaya Pravda.

In early 1992, as part of the new government formed by Boris Yeltsin, Mikhail Poltoranin was among the several Deputy Prime Ministers. His role was to oversee the ministries regarding the press and cultural sphere. In April of that year, Vice President of Russia Alexander Rutskoy accused Yeltsin and his allies in various acts of corruption, including Poltoranin, who was accused of illegally selling off Russian property in Berlin.

On August 3–8, 1992, Poltoranin visited Japan where he discussed the Kuril Islands dispute with Japanese officials, and proposed to get the United States involved in the question. The goal of this was to make sure that Russia's security interests in the region were addressed.

Poltoranin ended up being sacked on 25 November 1992 from both his post as Minister of Information and Deputy Chairman of Government of the Russian Federation. This was largely viewed as a move to placate the conservative opposition by President Yeltsin, who wanted to win their support in the Congress of People's Deputies of Russia for his economic plan. Poltoranin understood this and accepted the status of being a political sacrifice.

Works
After stepping down from the government, Poltoranin published a book titled The lonely tsar in the Kremlin: Yeltsin and his team during the late 1990s.

Racist views 
Poltoranin expresses vehemently anti-Vainakh sentiments in his writings. In Chapter 5 of his book "Powerful as TNT. The Legacy of Tsar Boris" (Russian: Власть в тротиловом эквиваленте. Наследие царя Бориса) he describes allowing exiled Chechens to return to Chechnya as "Chechenization of Russia", uses the phrase "acting Vainakh" as an insult, and compares Vainakh lands to sewage pits to support his reason for wanting to have a Chechen-Ingush Republic in East Kazakhstan instead of inside the North Caucasus of Russia.

Sources

References

Books
 
 
 
 

1939 births
20th-century Russian politicians
Deputy heads of government of the Russian Federation
Government ministers of Russia
Living people
Russian journalists
First convocation members of the State Duma (Russian Federation)